Macquarie University Australian Football Club is an Australian rules football club based in Sydney, Australia. The club colours are black, red and white and they are nicknamed the Warriors. Macquarie Uni participates in Division One of the Sydney AFL league. Teams also play in third Division, and Under 18s second Division. The women's team plays in Division one, after being promoted following their undefeated premiership season in 2013.

History
Formerly known under the moniker of the Kookaburras, Macquarie University AFC dates back to 1969, two years after Macquarie University had been established. Up until 2009 the club played in a green and yellow strip but changed to its current colors of black, red and white for the 2010 season. In 2018 to align with the University's branding their colors changed to black, red, magenta and white.

Current Teams

Premierships: Men's - 1998, 1999, 2000, and 2009. Women's - 2013 and 2019

Mostyn Medallists: Amanda Farrugia 2015, 2017 and 2019. Philippa Smyth 2018

Notable players
 Amanda Farrugia (GWS GIANTS)
 Ellie Brush (GWS GIANTS)
 Emma Swanson (GWS GIANTS)
 Philippa Smyth (GWS GIANTS)

External links
 
 fullpointsfooty.net

Australian rules football clubs in Sydney
1969 establishments in Australia
Australian rules football clubs established in 1969